The 1818 United States elections occurred in the middle of Democratic-Republican President James Monroe's first term, during the First Party System and the Era of Good Feelings. Members of the 16th United States Congress were chosen in this election. During the 16th Congress, Alabama and Maine joined the union. Democratic-Republicans continued to dominate both chambers of Congress, and slightly increased their majority in both houses of Congress in this election.

See also
1818–19 United States House of Representatives elections
1818–19 United States Senate elections

References

1818 elections in the United States
1818
United States midterm elections